Troy is a town in Montgomery County, North Carolina, United States. The population was 3,188 at the 2010 census. It is the county seat of Montgomery County. The short story by Charles W. Chesnutt, called "The Sheriff's Children," is set in Troy.

History
The Hotel Troy, Montgomery County Courthouse, and Troy Residential Historic District are listed on the National Register of Historic Places.

The Town of Troy has had 12 mayors. Roy J. Maness served as Mayor of Troy from 1978 until 2018. Sherri Harris Allgood succeeded Maness as Mayor of Troy in December 2018. She is the first female and first African American to serve as Mayor of Troy.

Geography
Troy is located at  (35.360420, -79.896412).

Troy, along with most of Montgomery County, lies within the Uwharrie National Forest.

Demographics

2020 census

As of the 2020 United States census, there were 2,850 people, 1,099 households, and 547 families residing in the town.

2010 census
As of the census of 2010, there were 3,189 people, 1,115 households, and 704 families residing in the town. The population density was 1,156.8 people per square mile (445.9/km). There were 1,209 housing units at an average density of 407.7 per square mile (157.2/km). The racial makeup of the town was 58.9% White, 31.8% African American, 0.73% Native American, 1.0% Asian, 3.32% from other races, and 1.5% from two or more races. Hispanic or Latino of any race were 10.3% of the population.

There were 1,108 households, out of which 30.3% had children under the age of 18 living with them, 37.2% were married couples living together, 20.4% had a female householder with no husband present, and 36.9% were non-families. 34.6% of all households were made up of individuals, and 16.0% had someone living alone who was 65 years of age or older. The average household size was 2.38 and the average family size was 3.04.

In the town, the population was spread out, with 21.6% under the age of 18, 11.1% from 18 to 24, 35.0% from 25 to 44, 16.9% from 45 to 64, and 15.4% who were 65 years of age or older. The median age was 36.7 years. Male population makes up 37% with a median age of 34.1 years.  The female population makes up 63% with a median age of 37.7 years.

The median income for a household in the town was $22,933, and the median income for a family was $33,984. Males had a median income of $29,500 versus $19,861 for females. The per capita income for the town was $11,420. About 20.9% of families and 24.8% of the population were below the poverty line, including 32.8% of those under age 18 and 26.1% of those age 65 or over.  Of the 1,115 occupied housing units, 46.7% are owner-occupied housing units while 53.3% are renter-occupied housing units.

Education
Montgomery Community College
Montgomery County Central High School (planned completion 2019)
Montgomery Learning Academy
Page Street Elementary

Notable person
 Henry F. Warner, United States Army soldier and recipient of the Medal of Honor for his actions in World War II

References

External links
 Official website of Troy, NC

Towns in Montgomery County, North Carolina
Towns in North Carolina
County seats in North Carolina